66 Scenes from America is a 1982 Danish documentary film directed by Jørgen Leth. It presents a variety of short scenes with no connecting narrative. People are shown engaged in ordinary activities with minimal direction. Leth described it as containing "large and small things, events, people, thoughts and feelings". The original plan for the film was to include 40 different scenes, but once filming began it was expanded to 66.

The film's best-known scene shows artist Andy Warhol eating a Whopper hamburger from the fast food restaurant chain Burger King. The scene is the longest in the film, in part because Warhol did not realize he was expected to say his name immediately after he finished eating, and Leth did not edit out the awkward pause that resulted. In 2019, Burger King aired an excerpt from the scene as a commercial during Super Bowl LIII.

References

External links

1982 films
1980s avant-garde and experimental films
1982 documentary films
Danish avant-garde and experimental films
Danish documentary films
Documentary films about the United States
Films directed by Jørgen Leth
Films shot in the United States